Jordan is an unincorporated community in Marion County, West Virginia, United States.

The community most likely derives its name from one Mr. Jorgensen, a mining official.

References

Unincorporated communities in Marion County, West Virginia
Unincorporated communities in West Virginia
Coal towns in West Virginia
West Virginia populated places on the Monongahela River